Beaver Township is a township in Saline County, Arkansas, United States. Its total population was 3,211 as of the 2010 United States Census, an increase of 20.22 percent from 2,671 at the 2000 census.

According to the 2010 Census, Beaver Township is located at  (34.719002, -92.587488).

Avilla and part of the city of Bryant are located within the township.

References

External links 

Townships in Arkansas
Populated places in Saline County, Arkansas